George Henry Roland Rogers, CBE (9 December 1906 – 19 February 1983) was a British Labour Member of Parliament.

Rogers was educated at Middlesex elementary and grammar schools. He served as a councillor on Wembley Borough Council 1937–41 and worked as a railway clerk, then an industrial consultant with London Transport. He was a member of the TSSA. During World War II, he was a corporal in the Royal Signals.

Rogers was elected as MP for Kensington North in 1945. He was Secretary of the Parliamentary Painting Group 1950–1970 and Parliamentary Private Secretary to George Strauss, Minister of Supply from 1947 to 1949 and to Kenneth Younger, Minister of State for Foreign Affairs in 1950.  He was a delegate to the United Nations Assembly in 1950, and to the Council of Europe and Western European Union from 1961 to 1963.

He served as an opposition Whip 1954–1964 and as Member of the Commons Chairmen's Panel 1952–54 and 1966. He was a Lord Commissioner of the Treasury and Government Whip, October 1964 – January 1966.
Rogers was appointed a CBE in 1965 and stepped down from parliament in 1970.

References

External links 
 

1906 births
1983 deaths
British Army personnel of World War II
Commanders of the Order of the British Empire
Councillors in Greater London
Labour Party (UK) MPs for English constituencies
Ministers in the Wilson governments, 1964–1970
Royal Corps of Signals soldiers
Transport Salaried Staffs' Association-sponsored MPs
UK MPs 1945–1950
UK MPs 1950–1951
UK MPs 1951–1955
UK MPs 1955–1959
UK MPs 1959–1964
UK MPs 1964–1966
UK MPs 1966–1970